M. phyllostachydis may refer to:
 Meliola phyllostachydis, W. Yamam, a fungus species of the genus Meliola
 Mycosphaerella phyllostachydis, a plant pathogen fungus species of the genus Mycosphaerella

See also
 Phyllostachydis (disambiguation)